David J. Linden (born November 3, 1961) is an American professor of neuroscience at Johns Hopkins University in Baltimore, Maryland, and the author of The Accidental Mind: How Brain Evolution Has Given Us Love, Memory, Dreams, and God.
 The book The Accidental Mind is an attempt to explain the human brain to intelligent lay readers, and recently received a silver medal in the category of Science from the Independent Publisher Association. As of July 1, 2008, he has been the Editor-in-Chief of the Journal of Neurophysiology.
Linden's second book, The Compass of Pleasure: How Our Brains Make Fatty Foods, Orgasm, Exercise, Marijuana, Generosity, Vodka, Learning, and Gambling Feel So Good, was released on April 14, 2011.

In addition to Linden's academic research, he is known as a popularizer of brain science, often making biochemistry understandable to non-science majors in his numerous appearances on the radio and on college campuses.

Brain chemistry and neuroscience 

Most of Linden's undergraduate work was performed at University of California, Berkeley; his graduate work took place at Northwestern University in Evanston, Illinois. He also worked briefly at Hoffmann-La Roche, in Nutley, New Jersey after receiving his doctorate. The aspect of his work that appeals to "lay people" is becoming increasingly popular, which has led to appearances around the country in which he discusses quirky facts about brain chemistry, and grants interviews on neuroscience. At a recent talk for freshmen at a liberal arts college, he proclaimed I had no idea my book would become required reading for 500 freshmen. I'm so sorry; I feel like those guys who worked on the Manhattan Project.

Newsweek ran an extensive summary of The Accidental Mind in 2007 by Sharon Begley that summarized his conclusions:

In the spring of 2007 the online magazine Slate ran a roundup of interviews with the nation's top popularizers of brain science in which Linden declared, somewhat facetiously:

Personal life 

Born in 1961, Linden grew up in Santa Monica, California; his late father was a well-regarded psychiatrist in Los Angeles with a celebrity clientele; his mother, now retired, was an editor of (and proofreader for) textbook publishers.

Linden attended Santa Monica High School, where he was sometimes associated with a crowd that called itself "The Olive Starlight Orchestra," or "The Olives" for short (the group had nothing to do with music). He knew people like Sandra Tsing Loh, Daphne Nugent, Jan Steckel, film editor Kate Sanford, internet activist Susan P. Crawford, mathematician and teacher Paul Lockhart, entrepreneur Keith Goldfarb (co-founder of Rhythm and Hues), computer-graphics researcher Greg Turk, and speculative fiction writer Janine Ellen Young. The Olives were loosely affiliated with Tsing Loh's organization at Samohi, "The Young Bureaucrats, Of Course" (YBOC), and were referred to by conservative blogger Joy McCann as "the late 20th Century's Bloomsbury Group."

Linden is an amateur photographer, and has held a few private exhibitions, including one that featured pictures of house paint, and one in the 1990s that concentrated on images of neon signage.

Linden now lives in Baltimore with his daughter and son.

On December 30, 2021, David announced that he was recently diagnosed with terminal cancer in an article in the Atlantic titled "A Neuroscientist Prepares for Death."

Writings 

The Web of Science lists 87 articles in peer-reviewed journals for Linden, which have been cited over 6000 times, giving him an h-index of over 40.

Linden was also featured in a tribute to children's literature entitled Everything I Need To Know I Learned from a Children's Book, compiled by Anita Silvey and published in 2009; his contribution was an ode to Homer Price.

References

External links 
   Dr. Linden's Official Web Page
 Dr. Linden's Faculty Page from the Johns Hopkins University School of Medicine Website
 Biography at The Physiologist
 Article about The Accidental Mind in Newsweek
 Article about the nation's top popular writers on neuroscience in an April, 2007 issue of Slate

1961 births
Living people
American neuroscientists
University of California, Berkeley alumni
Northwestern University alumni
Johns Hopkins University faculty